Vinubhai Patel is a Fiji Indian politician who was elected to the House of Representatives of Fiji in 1987.

For the 1987 general election, the NFP–Labour Coalition chose him as a candidate for the Lautoka Indian Communal Constituency which he won easily, but was a member of Parliament for a month when the military coup of 1987 prematurely ended his political career.

References 

National Federation Party politicians
Indian members of the House of Representatives (Fiji)
Fijian Hindus
Living people
Politicians from Lautoka
Year of birth missing (living people)